La Serena is a town in Cundinamarca, Colombia.

References

Populated places in the Cundinamarca Department